Gomphodesmidae is a family of millipedes in the order Polydesmida, containing around 55 genera and 150 species.
The family is native to Africa, and occurs primarily in savanna habitat (open-canopy grasslands) from South Africa north to Senegal and Ethiopia.

Genera

 Aenictogomphus
 Agrophogonus
 Antiphonus
 Astrodesmus
 Auliscodesmus
 Aulodesmus
 Brachytelopus
 Clastrotylus
 Diallagmogon
 Elaphogonus
 Emphysemastix
 Emplectomastix
 Endecaporus
 Erythranassa
 Euporogomphus
 Euryzonus
 Exaesiotylus
 Exochopyge
 Giryama
 Gomphodesmus
 Haplogomphodesmus
 Hapsidodesmus
 Harmodesmus
 Helictogomphus
 Ionidesmus
 Ithynteria
 Kilimagomphus
 Litogonopus
 Marptodesmus
 Masaigomphus
 Merodesmus
 Mitumbagomphus
 Molyrogomphus
 Mychodesmus
 Nematogomphus
 Neodesmus
 Ngurubates
 Ovoidesmus
 Pogoro
 Proagomphus
 Protastrodesmus
 Protyligmagon
 Scaptogonodesmus
 Schizogomphodesmus
 Sigmodesmus
 Sigodesmus
 Sphenodesmus
 Stenotyligma
 Streptelopus
 Tycodesmus
 Tymbodesmus
 Ulodesmus
 Uluguria
 Usambaranus
 Vaalogomphus
 Virungula

References

Polydesmida
Millipedes of Africa
Millipede families